Halle Rose Houssein (born 11 December 2004) is an English footballer who plays as a midfielder for West Ham United.

Career
Houssein started her career with English top flight side Arsenal. On 12 September 2021, she debuted for Arsenal during a 4–0 win over Reading. Before the second half of 2021–22, Houssein signed for West Ham United in England.

Personal life
Houssein is of Cypriot-Turkish descent.

References

External links
 

Living people
2004 births
English people of Turkish descent
English people of Turkish Cypriot descent
English women's footballers
Women's association football midfielders
Women's Super League players
Arsenal W.F.C. players
West Ham United F.C. Women players